Dutch Reformed Church of Gansevoort is a historic Dutch Reformed church at 10 Catherine Street in Gansevoort, Saratoga County, New York.  It was built about 1840 and is a two-story, rectangular brick building on a cut-stone foundation in a vernacular Greek Revival style.  It is topped by a moderately pitched, slate-covered gable roof.  It features a wooden belfry with louvered openings topped with a pedimented gable roof.  The church closed in the 1950s.

It was listed on the National Register of Historic Places in 1995, and was demolished in 1996.

References

Reformed Church in America churches in New York (state)
Churches on the National Register of Historic Places in New York (state)
Churches completed in 1840
19th-century Reformed Church in America church buildings
Churches in Saratoga County, New York
National Register of Historic Places in Saratoga County, New York
Buildings and structures demolished in 1996
Demolished buildings and structures in New York (state)